Charles H. Pinkham (18 August 1844 – 6 November 1920) was born in Grafton, Massachusetts in 1844. In 1895, President Grover Cleveland presented him with the Medal of Honor for his service in the American Civil War. He is buried in Hope Cemetery, Worcester, Massachusetts.

Pinkham joined the Army from Worcester, Massachusetts in December 1863, and was mustered out as a brevet Captain in July 1865. 

He had been a Sergeant Major with the 57th Massachusetts Infantry, and was "among the soldiers who stormed Fort Steadman during the Battle of Petersburg in March 1865." His official Medal of Honor citation reads: "Captured the flag of the 57th North Carolina Infantry (C.S.A.) and saved his own colors by tearing them from the staff while the enemy was in the camp."

References

 Worcester Magazine, May 22, 2008, pg 13

External links

1844 births
1920 deaths
Union Army soldiers
United States Army Medal of Honor recipients
People from Grafton, Massachusetts
American Civil War recipients of the Medal of Honor
Burials at Hope Cemetery (Worcester, Massachusetts)